Creative Wonders was an educational software corporation from 1994 to 1999. It created computer games based on children's characters like Sesame Street, Madeline, Schoolhouse Rock!, Arthur, Little Bear, Dr. Seuss and ABC World Reference. It was a joint-venture between Electronic Arts and ABC.

History

Creative Wonders started out in 1994 as a division of Electronic Arts called EA Kids before renaming to Creative Wonders. Creative Wonders was responsible for creating popular games like the Sesame Street and Madeline series, and took over publishing of "EA 3D Atlas" which had been created by The Multimedia Corporation in London (a BBC company). In 1995, Creative Wonders teamed with ABC to create the ABC World Reference Series, a series of encyclopedias and atlases on CD-ROM based on "EA 3D Atlas", produced by The Multimedia Corporation and incorporating content and branding from ABC.

In 1998, Creative Wonders' assets were purchased by The Learning Company, and sold ABC and Electronic Arts to that company, and, later in 1999, it was folded into the latter, and later Mattel Interactive.

Products
 Sesame Street (1994–1999)
 Madeline (1995–1999)
 Schoolhouse Rock (1995–1999)
 ABC World Reference Series (1994–1998)
 The Baby-Sitters Club (1997-1999)
 Arthur (1999)
 Little Bear (1999)
 Dr. Seuss (1999)

Software

Sesame Street
 Numbers (1994)
 Letters (1994)
 Let's Make a Word! (1995)
 Elmo's Art Workshop (1995)
 Get Set to Learn (1996)
 Elmo's Preschool (1996)
 Search and Learn Adventures (1997)
Sesame Street Reading Is Fun Toddler (1997)
 Grover's Travels (1998)
 The Three Grouchketeers (1998)
 Elmo's Reading Basics (1998)
Elmo's Reading Preschool (1998)
 Elmo Through the Looking-Glass (1998)
 Baby and Me (1999)

Madeline
 Madeline and the Magnificent Puppet Show: A Learning Journey (1995)
 Madeline European Adventures (1996)
 Madeline Thinking Games (1996)
 Madeline Preschool & Kindergarten (1997)
 Madeline 1st and 2nd Grade (1997)
 Madeline Rainy Day Activities (1998)
 Madeline 1st and 2nd Grade Reading (1999)
 Madeline 1st and 2nd Grade Math (1999)

Schoolhouse Rock!
 Schoolhouse Rock!: Grammar Rock (1995)
 Schoolhouse Rock!: Math Rock (1996)
 Schoolhouse Rock!: America Rock (1996)
 Schoolhouse Rock!: Exploration Station (1997)
 Schoolhouse Rock!: Activity Pack (1997)
 Schoolhouse Rock!: 1st & 4th Grade Math Essentials (1997)
 Schoolhouse Rock!: 1st & 2nd Grade Essentials (1997)
 Schoolhouse Rock!: 3rd & 4th Grade Essentials (1997)
 Schoolhouse Rock!: 5th & 6th Grade Essentials (1998)
 Schoolhouse Rock!: Money Rock (1998)
 Schoolhouse Rock!: Thinking Games (1998)

ABC World Reference Series
 3D Atlas (1994–1997)
 3D Atlas 97 (1994)
 3D Atlas 98 (1997)
 Wide World of Animals (1995–1997)
 Wide World of Animals '99 (1998)
 World News Insight (1995)
 ABC NewsLinks (1996)
 Wide World of Dinosaurs (1998)

The Baby-Sitters Club
 The Baby-Sitters Club: Clubhouse Activity Center (1997)
 The Baby-Sitters Club: 3rd Grade Learning Adventures (1998)
 The Baby-Sitters Club: 4th Grade Learning Adventures (1998)
 The Baby-Sitters Club: 5th Grade Learning Adventures (1999)
 The Baby-Sitters Club: 6th Grade Learning Adventures (1999)

Arthur
 Arthur's Kindergarten (1999)
 Arthur's 1st Grade (1999)
 Arthur's 2nd Grade (1999)
 Arthur's Reading Games (1999)
 Arthur's Math Games (1999)
 Arthur's Thinking Games (1999)

Little Bear
 Little Bear: Toddler Discovery Adventures (1999)
 Little Bear: Preschool Thinking Adventures (1999)
 Little Bear: Kindergarten Thinking Adventures (1999)
 Little Bear's Rainy Day Activities (1999)

Dr. Seuss
 Dr. Seuss Toddler (1999)
 Dr. Seuss Preschool (1999)
 Dr. Seuss Preschool and Kindergarten Reading (1999)
 Dr. Seuss Kindergarten (1999)
 Dr. Seuss Reading Games (1999)

Others
 Family Album Creator (1996)
 Slam Dunk Typing (1997)
 Type Like A Pro (1998)

See also
Electronic Arts
ABC
The Learning Company
Knowledge Adventure
Mattel Interactive

References

American Broadcasting Company
Creative Wonders games
Defunct video game companies of the United States
Video game companies disestablished in 1999
Video game companies established in 1994